Polak is a Polish-language surname.

Polak may also refer to:
 Spelling without diacritics of the Czech surname Polák
 Polak model, monetary approach to the balance of payment 
 Polak and Sullivan, American architectural firm

See also

Polack (disambiguation)
Pollack (disambiguation)